The Kumbukumbu Room, or Kumbukumbu Room: Africa, Memory and Heritage, or Kumbukumbu Exhibition, was one of the spaces of the National Museum of Brazil, destroyed by the fire of 2018. The name of the room refers to a word in Swahili, used for "objects, people or events that make us think about the past."

In the room, objects from the African and Afro-Brazilian collections were on display. In particular, the collections Police of the Court and Heloísa Alberto Torres were featured. Also in the room were the set of gifts from Africa sent to John, the Clement, in 1810, including the Throne of the King of Dahomey. Most of the objects on display were from the 19th century.

The room was organized from nine showcases, six side and three central, and a map from which one could establish the origin of the exposed pieces. According to the official book of presentation of the exhibition:

Division 
The room was divided into six spaces:

 The Diplomacy of Friendship
 The colonial war 
 Africans in Brazil 
 Angola after the Atlantic slavery 
 The people of the equatorial forest
 Africa past and present

External links 

 Official page.
 Book about the exhibition.

National Museum of Brazil